Seebach is a municipality in the Wartburgkreis district of Thuringia, Germany.

History
Within the German Empire (1871-1918), Seebach was part of the Grand Duchy of Saxe-Weimar-Eisenach.

See also

References

Wartburgkreis